Torgeir Moan (born 2 June 1944) is a Norwegian engineer and professor of marine technology at the Norwegian University of Science and Technology.

Career
Born on 2 June 1944, Moan graduated as construction engineer in 1968, and as Ph.D in 1975. He was appointed professor at the Norwegian University of Science and Technology from 1978.

He has worked with design and analysis of marine constructions such as ships, oil platforms, wind turbines and floating bridges, often with specific focus on aspects of safety. He has published around 700 scientific publications.

Moan is a member of the Norwegian Academy of Science and Letters, and of the Royal Academy of Engineering.

References

External links
Curriculum vitae

1944 births
Living people
People from Malvik
Norwegian engineers
Norwegian Institute of Technology alumni
Academic staff of the Norwegian Institute of Technology
Academic staff of the Norwegian University of Science and Technology
Fellows of the Royal Academy of Engineering
Members of the Norwegian Academy of Science and Letters
Members of the Norwegian Academy of Technological Sciences
Foreign members of the Chinese Academy of Engineering